Dmytro Kushnirov (born 1 April 1990) is a Ukrainian retired professional football defender who last played for Daugava Daugavpils in the Latvian Higher League and currently is retired from professional football career.

Kushnirov is product of RVUFK Kyiv sportive school.

He became the Champion of the European Under-19 Football Championship in 2009.

As for 2016 Kushnirov is working in the Ukrainian police and in February 2017 was promoted to the police rank of lieutenant.

Honours 
2009 UEFA European Under-19 Football Championship: Champion

References

External links
 
 

1990 births
Living people
People from Talne
Ukrainian footballers
Association football defenders
Ukraine youth international footballers
Ukraine under-21 international footballers
Piddubny Olympic College alumni
FC Dynamo-2 Kyiv players
FC Dynamo-3 Kyiv players
FC Daugava players
Ukrainian First League players
Ukrainian Second League players
Latvian Higher League players
Ukrainian expatriate footballers
Expatriate footballers in Latvia
Ukrainian expatriate sportspeople in Latvia
Ukrainian police officers
Sportspeople from Cherkasy Oblast